Karawata saxicola is a species of flowering plant in the family Bromeliaceae, native to southeastern Brazil, in the states of Espírito Santo and Rio de Janeiro. It was first described by Lyman Bradford Smith in 1950 as Aechmea saxicola.

References

Bromelioideae
Flora of Brazil
Plants described in 1950